1310 Villigera, provisional designation , is a stony asteroid and large Mars-crosser from the innermost regions of the asteroid belt, approximately 14 kilometers in diameter. It was discovered on 28 February 1932, by German astronomer Friedrich Schwassmann at Bergedorf Observatory in Hamburg, Germany. The asteroid was named after astronomer Walther Villiger.

Orbit and classification 

Villigera is a Mars-crossing asteroid, a dynamically unstable group between the main belt and the near-Earth populations, crossing the orbit of Mars at 1.666 AU. It orbits the Sun in the inner main-belt at a distance of 1.5–3.2 AU once every 3 years and 8 months (1,352 days). Its orbit has an eccentricity of 0.36 and an inclination of 21° with respect to the ecliptic. No precoveries were taken, and no prior identifications were made. The body's observation arc begins 10 days after its official discovery observation with its first used observation at Uccle Observatory.

Physical characteristics 

Villigera is a common S-type asteroid on the Tholen taxonomic scheme.

Lightcurves 

In October 2001, a first rotational lightcurve of Villigera was obtained by astronomer Robert Koff at Thornton Observatory in Colorado. Light curve analysis gave a well-defined rotation period of 7.830 hours with a brightness variation of 0.39 magnitude.

Photometric observations by astronomers René Roy, Raoul Behrend and Pierre Antonini in February 2006, gave a concurring period of 7.834 hours and an amplitude of 0.36 magnitude. In 2016, a modeled lightcurves using photometric data from various sources, rendered an identical period of 7.830 and a spin axis of (3.0°, 63°) in ecliptic coordinates.

Diameter and albedo 

According to the survey carried out by NASA's Wide-field Infrared Survey Explorer with its subsequent NEOWISE mission, Villigera measures 13.76 kilometers in diameter and its surface has an albedo of 0.245. The Collaborative Asteroid Lightcurve Link assumes a standard albedo for stony asteroids of 0.20 and calculates a diameter of 15.24 kilometers, with an absolute magnitude of 11.45. Based on a generic magnitude-to-diameter conversion, Villigera measures between 13 and 30 kilometers for an albedo in the range of 0.05 to 0.25.

This makes Villigera one of the largest mid-sized Mars-crossing asteroids comparable with 1065 Amundsenia (9.75 km), 1139 Atami (9.35 km), 1474 Beira (8.73 km), 1011 Laodamia (7.5 km), 1727 Mette (est. 9 km), 1131 Porzia (7 km), 1235 Schorria (est. 9 km), 985 Rosina (8.18 km) and 1468 Zomba (7 km), but smaller than the largest members of this dynamical group, namely, 132 Aethra, 323 Brucia, 1508 Kemi, 2204 Lyyli and 512 Taurinensis, which are all larger than 20 kilometers in diameter.

Naming 

This minor planet was named in honour of Swiss astronomer Walther Villiger (1872–1938), who himself discovered the main-belt asteroid 428 Monachia at Munich in 1897. The official naming citation was also mentioned in The Names of the Minor Planets by Paul Herget in 1955.

Notes

References

External links 
 Asteroid Lightcurve Database (LCDB), query form (info )
 Dictionary of Minor Planet Names, Google books
 Asteroids and comets rotation curves, CdR – Observatoire de Genève, Raoul Behrend
 Discovery Circumstances: Numbered Minor Planets (1)-(5000) – Minor Planet Center
 
 

001310
Discoveries by Friedrich Karl Arnold Schwassmann
Named minor planets
001310
19320228